The Miguel de Cervantes Memorial by Joseph Jacinto Mora is located in Golden Gate Park in San Francisco,  California.

External links
 

Busts in California
Golden Gate Park
Monuments and memorials in California
Outdoor sculptures in San Francisco
Sculptures of men in California
Statues in California
Statues of Miguel de Cervantes
Vandalized works of art in California
Works based on Don Quixote